Fuat Deniz (24 July 1967 – 13 December 2007) was a Swedish sociologist and writer of Assyrian descent. Until his murder in 2007, he worked as a lecturer in sociology at the Department of Social and Political Sciences at Örebro University.

Deniz was born as the oldest son into an Assyrian family in the village of Dargeçit in Tur Abdin, Turkey. He came to Sweden with his parents as an eight-year-old and grew up in Örebro. In his youth he was active in the Assyrian Youth Federation in Sweden, which he also co-founded, and was also a diligent writer for the Swedish National Assyrian Federation's magazine Hujådå. He earned a Ph.D. in sociology at Uppsala University in 1999. In his doctoral thesis, titled En minoritets odyssé ("The Odyssey of a Minority"), he discussed the experiences of Assyrians coming to Sweden in the 1970s. Deniz was a well-known figure among the Assyrian community in Sweden and was also internationally known for his research on the Assyrian genocide.

On 11 December 2007, at approximately 15.30 CET, Deniz was attacked and stabbed in the back of his neck inside Örebro University. He died two days later from his injuries at Örebro University Hospital. Early on there were some speculations in the media about a possible political motive behind the murder due to Deniz' research on the Assyrian genocide. On 16 January 2008, a 42-year-old man from Gothenburg, Sweden, was arrested on suspicion for the murder. The suspect, who according to the police is a close relative of Deniz, has admitted to the stabbing but denied any intent to kill. The police said that an old feud between the two family members was the most likely motive for the killing and ruled out any political connections.

Works

References 

1967 births
2007 deaths
Academic staff of Örebro University
People from Dargeçit
People from Örebro
Swedish people of Assyrian/Syriac descent
Swedish sociologists
Swedish male writers
Swedish murder victims
People murdered in Sweden
Deaths by stabbing in Sweden
Turkish people of Assyrian descent
2007 murders in Sweden